The Ermaying Formation is a sedimentary succession of Anisian (Middle Triassic) age. It is found in the Shaanxi Province of China. It is composed of an up to 600 m thick sequence of mudstone and sandstone. It is famous for its fossils of tetrapods.

Fossil content 
Notable fossils include the genera Fenhosuchus, Eumetabolodon, Halazhaisuchus, Guchengosuchus, Neoprocolophon, Ordosiodon, Wangisuchus and Shansisuchus.

References 

Geologic formations of China
Triassic System of Asia
Triassic China
Anisian Stage
Mudstone formations
Sandstone formations
Tuff formations
Fossiliferous stratigraphic units of Asia
Paleontology in Shaanxi
Paleontology in Shanxi
Paleontology in Inner Mongolia